Patrick Warner is an Irish-Canadian author residing in St. John's, Newfoundland. He writes both fiction novels and poetry. Warner has won several awards for his works, including the Newfoundland and Labrador Arts and Letters Award, the Newfoundland Book Award, the Percy Janes First Novel Award, and the Independent Publisher Regional Fiction Award.

Life 
Warner emigrated from County Mayo, Ireland to Newfoundland in 1980. He attended the Memorial University of Newfoundland for his undergraduate degree, earning a Bachelor's in English and Anthropology. He received a Masters in Library and Information Sciences from the University of Western Ontario. He works at the Queen Elizabeth II Library at the Memorial University of Newfoundland as a special collections librarian.

Works 
 All Manner of Misunderstanding (2001)
 There, There (2005)
 Mole (2009)
 Double Talk (2011) 
 Perfection (2012)
One Hit Wonders (2015)
 Octopus (2016) 
 My Camino (2019)

Awards 

 2002 Newfoundland and Labrador Arts and Letters Award for "Capelin"
 2004 Newfoundland and Labrador Arts and Letters Award for "Tortoise at Toronto Zoo"
 2007 Newfoundland Book Award for There, There
 2011 Newfoundland Book Award for Mole
 Percy Janes First Novel Award for Double Talk
 2012 Silver Medal for Best Regional Fiction (Canada-East) for Double Talk
 2016 Gold Medal for Canada East Fiction for One Hit Wonders
 2017 Newfoundland Book Award for Octopus

References 

Living people
Writers from St. John's, Newfoundland and Labrador
Irish emigrants to Canada
Year of birth missing (living people)